Andrea Mocenigo (after 1471 – 1542), son of Lunardo, was a Venetian senator of the republic and a historian and in 1495 protonotary apostolic.  He composed a work on the League of Cambrai entitled Belli memorabilis Cameracensis adversus Venetos historiae libri vi (Venice, 1525).

See also
Mocenigo family

References

1470s births
16th-century Venetian people
16th-century Italian nobility
1542 deaths
Andrea
Apostolic pronotaries